Brent Boyd is a former American football offensive guard and an advocate for retired football players. He is considered by many to be the "father" of the concussion awareness issue due to his three US Congressional testimonies and media crusade to fight for proper treatment of NFL retirees, their wives and families, and all people who suffer from traumatic brain injuries.

Biography
Boyd played college football at the University of California, Los Angeles. He graduated with Honors in 1980. He was accepted into law school but chose the NFL instead. The Minnesota Vikings selected him in the third round of the 1980 NFL Draft. He played for the Vikings through the 1986 season.

In his rookie year 1980, Brent earned First-team NFL ALL-ROOKIE team, but his path to stardom was sidetracked when he blew his knee out the next year 1981. He fought through this injury anyway and played seven seasons.

Boyd now resides in Reno, Nevada. He is named one of Reno's most prominent residents.

Brent is the founder of the NFL retired players advocacy group, Dignity After Football. He has testified before Congress about the NFL's player-disability plan and about the health issues that he faces as a result of concussions suffered during his playing days. . https://www.youtube.com/watch?v=DyOzKyUlNNg,  http://mynews4.com/news/local/inside-the-story-head-injuries-and-the-future-of-football

See also
Living former players diagnosed with or reporting symptoms of chronic traumatic encephalopathy

References

External links
Dignity After Football website
Congressional hearing on NFL's system for compensating retired players
 "Former Guard Brent Boyd's CTE Brain Scan,"
 GQ Casualties of the Gridiron, Episode 2, GQ magazine, Nov. 21, 2013. —Video. http://www.cbsnews.com/videos/judge-approves-nearly-1-billion-nfl-concussion-settlement/, https://www.youtube.com/watch?v=DyOzKyUlNNg
 http://mynews4.com/news/local/inside-the-story-head-injuries-and-the-future-of-football

1957 births
Living people
Sportspeople from Downey, California
American football offensive guards
UCLA Bruins football players
Minnesota Vikings players